is a Japanese professional baseball player. He plays catcher for the Tokyo Yakult Swallows.

In the 2021 Japan Series, he batted 7-for-22 (a team-best .318 average) with three RBIs and threw out a couple of base-runners to win the Japan Series Most Valuable Player Award.

References

External links

 NPB.com

Living people
Japanese baseball players
Nippon Professional Baseball catchers
People from Ōno, Fukui
Baseball people from Fukui Prefecture
Tokyo Yakult Swallows players
2015 WBSC Premier12 players
1990 births